Mohamed Mohyeldin (born 1 October 1991) is an Egyptian judoka. At the 2016 Summer Olympics he competed in the Men's -73kg.

References

External links
 

1992 births
Living people
Olympic judoka of Egypt
Judoka at the 2016 Summer Olympics
Egyptian male judoka
African Games gold medalists for Egypt
African Games medalists in judo
Mediterranean Games bronze medalists for Egypt
Mediterranean Games medalists in judo
Competitors at the 2015 African Games
Competitors at the 2018 Mediterranean Games
20th-century Egyptian people
21st-century Egyptian people